A  is a domestic arrangement and committed relationship with three people in polyamorous romantic or sexual relations with each other, and often dwelling together; typically a traditional marriage between a man and woman along with another individual. The phrase is a loan from French meaning "household of three". Contemporary arrangements are sometimes identified as a throuple, thruple, or triad.

Terminology
This relationship type has elements of bisexuality involved, but usually at least one of the participants is heterosexual. Because this term is sometimes interchangeably used for a threesome, which solely refers to a sexual experience involving three people, it can sometimes be misrepresented as some type of perversion or casual encounter. However, the ménage à trois is a specific type of committed relationship, in which vows are often made. It doesn't apply to all polyamorous relationships with three individuals, since polyamory can have many different forms.

The topic sometimes overlaps seemingly opposing concepts such as Christian feminism and Lesbian feminism. These ideas were explored by film maker Angel Robinson in her film Professor Marston and the Wonder Women through the love story of historical couple William Moulton Marston and Elizabeth Holloway Marston with their research assistant Olive Byrne.

Both the term and way of life have become a topic of discussion in areas associated with Christendom and Romance languages.

Examples

Ancient history

Biblical
This relationship type is very much rooted in the traditional marriage ideas of the Abrahamic faiths, Christian views on marriage are prevalent in literature and media discussing this topic.

The patriarchs Abraham and Sarah had an arrangement similar to a ménage à trois with Sarah's handmaiden Hagar. Interpretations of this vary, for example Judaism and Islam treat it much more like a polygamous situation, whereas Christian sources sometimes discuss the love triangle aspect of it, which are not directly analogous with a ménage à trois. Similarly when Jacob married Leah and Rachel, the polygamy and love triangle angles are far more well researched than as a ménage à trois.

Christianity
Sappho's writings influenced the early Christian church, and the topic of lesbianism within the ménage à trois framework of Christian couples began to be explored in post-Renaissance literature within Christian media.

Post-Renaissance history 

History has a number of examples of ménages à trois relationships.

Grand Duchess Anna Leopoldovna, regent of Russia from 1740 to 1741, was involved simultaneously in affairs with the Saxon ambassador Count Moritz zu Lynar and her lady-in-waiting Mengden. The regent's relationship with Mengden caused much disgust in Russia, and many believed her preoccupation with her relationships with Lynar and Mengden at the expense of governing made her a danger to the state. She was later overthrown in a coup.

In his youth, thirteen years her junior, the French philosopher Jean-Jacques Rousseau was a protégé of the French noblewoman Françoise-Louise de Warens, who would become his first lover. He lived with her at her estate on and off since his teenage years, and in 1732, after he reached the age of 20, she initiated a sexual relationship with him while also being open about her sexual involvement with the steward of her house.

The German intellectual Dorothea von Rodde-Schlözer, her husband Mattheus Rodde and the French philosopher Charles de Villers also had a ménage à trois from 1794 until her husband's death in 1810.

Sir William Hamilton (British ambassador to Naples), his wife Emma Hamilton, and her lover, the naval hero Admiral Horatio Lord Nelson, were in a ménage à trois from 1799 until Nelson's death in 1805.

At the age of 16, in 1813, the future author of Frankenstein, Mary Godwin, eloped with her to-be husband Percy Bysshe Shelley and engaged in a ménage with Claire Clairmont, future lover of Lord Byron, with whom the Shelleys would later have an extensive relationship.

The political philosopher Friedrich Engels lived in a ménage à trois with his mistress Mary Burns and her sister Lizzie.

The Italian surrealist artist Leonor Fini (1907-1996) sustained a ménage à trois until her death with an Italian Count Stanislao Lepri and Polish writer Konstanty Jelenski in Paris. The relationship is believed to have impacted Fini's work as she depicts gender neutral individuals or figures where traditional gender roles are reversed with a passive male and dominant female, such as 'Woman Seated on Naked Man (1942)'. 

The Belgian artist/illustrator Félicien Rops (1833–1898) maintained a remarkable ménage à trois with two sisters, Aurélie and Léontine Dulac, who ran a successful fashion house in Paris "Maison Dulac" They each bore a child with him (one died at an early age) and they lived together for over 25 years, until his death.

The author E. Nesbit lived with her husband Hubert Bland and his mistress Alice Hoatson, and raised their children as her own.

In 1913, psychoanalyst Carl Jung began a relationship with a young patient, Toni Wolff, which lasted for some decades. Deirdre Bair, in her biography of Carl Jung, describes his wife Emma Jung as bearing up nobly as her husband insisted that Toni Wolff become part of their household, saying that Wolff was "his other wife".

The Russian and Soviet poet Vladimir Mayakovsky lived with Lilya Brik, who was considered his muse, and her husband Osip Brik, an avant garde writer and critic.

Robert Graves and his wife Nancy Nicholson for some years attempted a triadic relationship called "The Trinity" with Laura Riding, a woman that Graves met and fell in love with in 1926. This triangle became the "Holy Circle" with the addition of Irish poet Geoffrey Phibbs, who himself was still married to Irish artist Norah McGuinness.

As recounted by Arthur Koestler in The Invisible Writing, a conspicuous fixture of the intellectual life of 1930s Budapest was a threesome—a husband, his wife and the wife's lover—who were writers and literary critics and had the habit of every day spending many hours, the three of them together, at one of the Hungarian capital's well known cafes. As noted by Koestler, their relationship was so open and had lasted so many years that it was no longer the subject of gossip.

The writer Aldous Huxley and his first wife Maria engaged in a ménage with Mary Hutchinson, a friend of Clive Bell.

From 1939, Erwin Schrödinger, his wife, Annemarie Bertel, and his mistress, Hilde March, had a ménage à trois.

In 1963 the actress Hattie Jacques lived with her husband John Le Mesurier and her lover John Schofield.

Cultural instances
Folie à Deux winery has a popular set of wines labeled as Ménage à Trois.

Wonder Woman is based on two women that were in a real life ménage à trois, as featured in Professor Marston and the Wonder Women, the creator of the comic William Moulton Marston and his legal wife Elizabeth Holloway Marston had a polyamorous life partner, Olive Byrne.

See also
Bigamy
Committed relationship
Gang bang
Group sex
Love triangle
Open marriage
Open relationship
Polyamory
Polyandry
Polygamy
Polygyny
Swinging
Troilism

References

Further reading
Birbara Finocster, Michael Foster, Letha Friehakd. Three in Love: Ménages à trois from Ancient to Modern Times. .
Vicki Vantoch. The Threesome Handbook: A Practical Guide to sleeping with three.  .

External links
 
 How this Brit wooed two gorgeous women into his ‘throuple’ New York Daily News April 2015
 David meets: the cutest throuple Bear World Magazine July 2016

Intimate relationships
Group sex
3 (number)
Polyamory